This is a list of diplomatic missions in Papua New Guinea. The Independent State of Papua New Guinea is located in Oceania on the eastern half of the island of New Guinea.  Its capital city, Port Moresby, hosts 15 high commissions and embassies.

Diplomatic missions in Port Moresby

Embassies

Other missions/representative offices 
 (Economic & Cultural Office)
 (Delegation)

Consular missions

Lae

 (Consulate-General)

Vanimo

 (Consulate)

Accredited missions

Resident in Canberra, Australia

Resident in Jakarta, Indonesia

Resident in Singapore

Resident in Tokyo, Japan

Resident in Kuala Lumpur, Malaysia

Resident in other capitals
 (Suva, Fiji)
  (Wellington, New Zealand)

Closed missions 
  (Embassy closed in 1999)

See also
 Foreign relations of Papua New Guinea
 List of diplomatic missions of Papua New Guinea
 Visa requirements for Papua New Guinean citizens

References

Diplomatic missions
Papua New Guinea
Diplomatic missions